Kurech (Köräş) is a rural locality (a village) in Nikolayevsky Selsoviet, Blagoveshchensky District, Bashkortostan, Russia. The population was 49 as of 2010. There are 3 streets.

Geography 
Kurech is located 20 km west of Blagoveshchensk (the district's administrative centre) by road. Andreyevka is the nearest rural locality.

References 

Rural localities in Blagoveshchensky District